Bruce B. Zager (born December 11, 1952) is a former justice of the Iowa Supreme Court.

Education 
Zager was born and raised in Waterloo, Iowa. Zager was a high school classmate of David L. Baker, who he eventually replaced on the Iowa Supreme Court. Zager graduated from the University of Iowa in 1975 and from Drake University Law School in 1980.

Legal and judicial career 
From 1981 to 1999, Zager practiced in Waterloo. He was a part-time Black Hawk County attorney for twelve of those years. He was appointed to be a judge of the Iowa District Court in 1999. Zager was then appointed to the Iowa Supreme Court in 2011, after Iowa voters had removed three justices seeking reelection in response to the court unanimously legalizing same-sex marriage in Varnum v. Brien. Zager retired from the Iowa Supreme Court on September 3, 2018. Zager currently serves as the lone senior judge of the Iowa Supreme Court.

References

External links
Iowa Judicial Branch page for Bruce B. Zager
Ballotpedia Profile
VoteSmart Profile

1952 births
Living people
Justices of the Iowa Supreme Court
People from Waterloo, Iowa
University of Iowa alumni
21st-century American judges
Drake University Law School alumni